Keely Smith Sings the John Lennon—Paul McCartney Songbook is an album by the American singer Keely Smith of music written by the songwriting partnership of John Lennon and Paul McCartney. The album was successful in the United Kingdom.

Reception
The initial Billboard magazine review from November 14, 1964 commented that Smith's "distinct handling of the especially arranged tunes makes her come through with flying colors...Lennon and McCartney will love her for this".

Track listing
All tracks written by John Lennon and Paul McCartney.

 "If I Fell" – 3:05
 "This Girl" – 2:25
 "Please Please Me" – 2:48
 "And I Love Him" – 2:51
 "A World Without Love" – 3:17
 "She Loves You" – 3:14
 "A Hard Day's Night" – 3:09
 "Do You Want to Know a Secret?" – 2:46
 "Can't Buy Me Love" – 2:17
 "All My Loving" – 3:05
 "I Want to Hold Your Hand" – 3:03
 "P.S. I Love You" – 2:41

Personnel
Keely Smith – vocals
Benny Carter – arranger
Ernie Freeman – arranger
Ed Thrasher – art direction
Jimmy Bowen – production

References

External links
 

1964 albums
Albums arranged by Benny Carter
Albums arranged by Ernie Freeman
Albums produced by Jimmy Bowen
Keely Smith albums
Reprise Records albums
The Beatles tribute albums